Roswell may refer to:

 Roswell incident

Places in the United States
 Roswell, Colorado, a former settlement now part of Colorado Springs
 Roswell, Georgia, a suburb of Atlanta
 Roswell, Idaho
 Roswell, New Mexico, known for the purported 1947 UFO incident (see other uses below)
 Roswell, Ohio
 Roswell, South Dakota

People
 Roswell Beebe (1795–1856), American railroad executive; mayor of Little Rock, Arkansas
 Roswell L. Colt (1779–1856), American businessman
 Roswell Farnham (1827–1903), Governor of Vermont
 Roswell Field (1807–1869), American lawyer, politician 
 Roswell P. Flower (1835–1899), US congressman, and Governor of New York
 Roswell Gilpatric (1906–1996), American lawyer and politician
 Roswell G. Horr (1830–1896), American politician
 Roswell King (1765–1844) was an American businessman, planter and industrialist
 Roswell Park (surgeon) (1852–1914), American physician
 Roswell A. Parmenter (1821–1904), New York politician
 Roswell B. Rexford, Michigan politician
 Roswell S. Ripley (1823–1887), Confederate Army general
 Roswell Rudd (1935–2017), American musician
 Roswell Weston (1774–1861), New York politician and judge
 Roswell Williams, pseudonym of Frank Owen (author) (1893–1968), American novelist
 Maggie Roswell (born 1952), American actress

In culture and fiction
 Roswell High, a young adults book series written by Melinda Metz
 Roswell (TV series), a 1999 TV series about a group of aliens 
 Roswell, New Mexico (TV series), a 2019 TV series about a group of aliens
 Roswell (film), a 1994 television film about the Roswell UFO incident, sometimes called Roswell: The UFO Cover-up
 Stargate SG-1: Roswell, a 2007 novel by Sonny Whitelaw and Jennifer Fallon
 Roswell, Little Green Man, a comic book series
 "Roswell That Ends Well", an episode of Futurama
 Roswell, Texas, a serialized, online graphic novel

Other
 Roswell High School (New Mexico), a school in Roswell, New Mexico
 Roswell High School (Georgia), a school in the city of Roswell, Georgia
 Roswell International Air Center, an airport in Roswell, New Mexico
 Roswell springsnail, a species of freshwater snails
 Roswell Park Comprehensive Cancer Center, a cancer hospital in Buffalo, New York
 Roswell Recreation and Parks, a municipal department in Roswell, Georgia

See also

 
 
 Roswell High School (disambiguation)